Yuta Shimizu (born 9 June 1999) is a Japanese tennis player.

Shimizu has a career high ATP singles ranking of 313 achieved on 2 March 2020. He also has a career high ATP doubles ranking of 254 achieved on 12 September 2022.

Shimizu represents Japan at the Davis Cup, where he has a W/L record of 1–0.

Junior Grand Slam finals

Doubles: 1 (1 runner-up)

ATP Challenger and ITF Futures/World Tennis Tour finals

Singles: 17 (12–5)

Doubles: 21 (10 titles, 11 runners-up)

References

External links
 
 
 

1999 births
Living people
Japanese male tennis players
21st-century Japanese people